She County, or Shexian, is a county of southwestern Hebei Province, China, located on the lower reaches of the Zhang River and bordering Shanxi to the west and Henan to the south.

History
The present area was originally part of Jizhou, one of the Nine Provinces. During the Spring and Autumn period it was part of the state of Jin, and during the Warring States period, became part of the state of Wei. Later, during the Zhao and Qin Dynasties, it was part of Handan Commandery. In 206 BCE, it was officially established as a county, but instead named as Sha County, but not long after, was renamed to its present name. In the early part of the Eastern Han, it was renamed State of Shehou, part of the Wei Commandery. The Jin Dynasty (266–420) saw the area as part of Guangping Commandery. The present name was restored again during the Sui Dynasty, becoming part of Shangdang Commandery. However, in the early Tang, it was renamed Mo County. In the Southern Song, it was controlled by the Jin dynasty (1115–1234) and renamed Chongzhou. The county's name was restored for the last time during the Ming Dynasty, though it was temporarily part of Henan, and it was not until 1949, with the establishment of the People's Republic, that She County was returned to Hebei.

Administrative divisions
The county administers 9 towns and 8 townships.

Geography

The Zhang River, and its tributaries, is the primary river in the county, and eventually flows into the Hai River.

Climate

Transport
The location of She County at the intersection of the Handan–Changzhi and Beijing–Guangzhou Railways, and location along G22 Qingdao–Lanzhou Expressway and China National Highway 309 makes it an important transport hub for Hebei province.

References

County-level divisions of Hebei
Handan